American Legion Memorial Stadium is a 10,500-seat stadium located on 7th Street in the Elizabeth community of Charlotte, North Carolina. It is located on a complex with the Grady Cole Center. Both are located next to Central Piedmont Community College. Independence Park Stadium, a tiny public baseball stadium, is also close by. Memorial Stadium is mainly used for high school sporting events and also serves as a public venue. Before the construction of nearby Bank of America Stadium in 1996, Memorial Stadium was Charlotte's largest outdoor stadium, and is still the largest municipal venue in the city.

History
Ground was broken on the stadium in 1934 and the gates were officially opened two years later in 1936. Named in honor of local soldiers who fell in World War I, the stadium was a project of the Works Progress Administration.

Throughout the years the stadium hosted events of every kind, ranging from Presidential addresses to classic professional wrestling encounters featuring local hero Ric Flair. 
The stadium formerly hosted Charlotte (Central) High School (which is now Garinger). For many years afterward, as the city grew and opened more high schools, the stadium was used practically every week during the football season to accommodate both schools which had no campus stadium and large crowds which some campus stadiums could not contain for the more popular match-ups.

In February 1985, the stadium hosted a pair of preseason United States Football League (USFL) games, which the city hoped would attract an expansion team. The first game on February 2 saw the New Jersey Generals defeat the Memphis Showboats 16–3, while the Baltimore Stars beat the Tampa Bay Bandits 28–26 on February 16. The Generals–Showboats game drew just 11,667 fans due to rain compared to the approximately 20,000 who attended the Bandits–Stars meeting in sunny weather.

From 1937 to 2000, the stadium hosted the Shrine Bowl, which was an annual match-up of the top high school football players in North Carolina and South Carolina. Sometime during the 1960s and 1970s, Memorial Stadium gained upper level seating on both sides of the field, raising its capacity to over 20,000. 

For the past few years the stadium has hosted several band competitions. It has hosted the battle of the Bands between the biggest HBCUs in South Carolina, North Carolina, and Georgia, and hosted Drum Corps International competitions hosted by Carolina Crown.

The stadium also served as a neutral site for the 2002 and 2003 meetings between The Citadel and VMI, known as the Military Classic of the South.

Recent events
In late 2009 the east end of the stadium suffered significant damage after a storm drain under the structure caved in causing the stands above it to collapse. While repairs were being made, the stadium was closed for several months. The stadium reopened in July 2010 with a reduced capacity as a grass berm largely replaced the old seating.

Memorial Stadium served as the home field for the Charlotte Hounds MLL team. The team began play at the start of the 2012 season and used the stadium for home games until 2018. The team is currently on hiatus and hopes to return in 2021.

The stadium continues to play a large role in Charlotte-Mecklenburg high school football, as it hosts big ticket match-ups such as Butler v. Independence and Charlotte Latin v. Charlotte Country Day. The Myers Park Mustangs moved most of their 2012 home games to the stadium after renovations temporarily lowered capacity at Gus Purcell Stadium, their on-campus home.

In early 2015, the possibility arose of renovating the stadium to accommodate professional soccer in Charlotte and try to lure an MLS expansion franchise to the city, however this was only a proposal. Sometime during 2015, a new press box was constructed on the 'visitors' side of the stadium. The Mecklenburg County Commissioners approved a $23 million renovation plan in late 2017.

2019 reconstruction
In September 2019, Mecklenburg County Parks and Recreation broke ground on a $31.7 million reconstruction of the stadium, which became the new home of the USL Championship soccer team Charlotte Independence beginning in spring 2021. The reconstruction was completed in 2021. The existing stadium was demolished and re-built. The reconstruction added new concourse buildings, a memorial, a new scoreboard and other amenities. Historical elements of the stadium, such as the stone wall and ticket booths, were removed and preserved offsite, then reinstalled in the new structure. Capacity dropped to 10,500.

References

External links
 Survey and Research Report on The American Legion Memorial Stadium (1936) – Charlotte-Mecklenburg Historic Landmarks Commission.
 Memorial Stadium and Grady Cole Center at Google Maps
 Memorial Stadium Anniversary

1936 establishments in North Carolina
Art Deco architecture in North Carolina
Charlotte 49ers football
High school football venues in the United States
Soccer venues in North Carolina
Sports venues in Charlotte, North Carolina
Works Progress Administration in North Carolina
Lacrosse venues in North Carolina
Major League Lacrosse venues
Premier Lacrosse League venues
Sports venues completed in 1936
American football venues in North Carolina
Rugby union stadiums in the United States
College football venues